The Departmental Council of Allier is the deliberative assembly of the Allier department in the region of Auvergne-Rhône-Alpes. It consists of 38 members (general councillors) from 19 cantons.

The President of the Departmental Council is Claude Riboulet.

Executive

List of Presidents 
Since 1914, the Presidents of the Departmental Council of Allier have been.

Vice-Presidents 
The President of the Departmental Council is assisted by 10 vice-presidents chosen from among the departmental advisers. Each of them has a delegation of authority.

See also 

 Allier
 Departmental councils of France

References 

Allier
Allier